Ella Rumpf (born 4 February 1995) is a Swiss actress, best known for her role as Alexia in the 2016 horror drama film Raw, which won the Sutherland Trophy at the 2016 BFI London Film Festival. Her other notable roles include, critical acclaimed Tiger in Tiger Girl (2017) and Hanna in The Divine Order (2017), the Swiss entry for the Best Foreign Language Film at the 90th Academy Awards.

Life and career
Ella Rumpf was born in Paris and grew up in Zurich, Switzerland. Her father is a psychotherapist and her mother a lecturer. 
Rumpf went to the Steiner school and had her first taste of acting by winning the lead role in Romeo and Juliet at 14.
She appeared in her debut film at age 16 called Summer Outside in 2011 directed by Friederike Jehn.

Rumpf won the role of Ali in the multi-award-winning feature film War (Krieg), by Simon Jaquemet in 2014 and was nominated for Best Supporting Actress at the Swiss Film Awards. She shaved her head for the role. She attended the Giles Foreman Center for Acting in London from 2013–2015 after completing her studies at the Zurich University of Applied Sciences in 2013.

Ella Rumpf starred alongside Garance Marillier in Raw (2016). In 2017, she played the lead role in Tiger Girl and a  supporting role in The Divine Order (Die göttliche Ordnung). In 2022, Rumpf appeared in the HBO television series Tokyo Vice, directed by Michael Mann and written by J.T. Rogers.

She speaks Swiss German and French at a native level, and is fluent in German and English.

Filmography

Film

Television

Awards and nominations

References

External links

 

Living people
Swiss film actresses
Swiss television actresses
21st-century Swiss actresses
Actors from Zürich
Actresses from Paris
21st-century French actresses
1995 births